Indothais gradata is a species of sea snail, a marine gastropod mollusk, in the family Muricidae, the murex snails or rock snails.

References

External links
 MNHN, Paris: syntype
 Petit, de la Saussaye. (1850). Description de coquilles nouvelles. Journal de Conchyliologie. 1: 402-406, pl. 13.
 Reeve, L. A. (1846). Monograph of the genus Purpura. In: Conchologia iconica, or, illustrations of the shells of molluscous animals, Vol. 3. L. Reeve & Co., London. Pls. 1-13 and unpaginated text 
 Schepman M. M. (1919). On a collection of land- and freshwater Mollusca and a few marine Mollusca chiefly collected by Dr. H.A. Lorentz from New Guinea, the Aru Islands, Timor and Borneo. Nova Guinea. Résultats de l'expédition scientifique néerlandaise à la Nouvelle-Guinée en 1912 et 1913 sous les auspices de A. Franssen Herderschee. Vol 8. Zoologie. pp 155-196, pls 4-8

gradata
Gastropods described in 1846